Krishna Singh is a Fijian golfer and the brother of Hall of Fame golfer Vijay Singh. He has been featured in the top 600 in the Official World Golf Ranking in the 1990s. He has played on the PGA Tour of Australasia and his best career finish was 5th at the 1992 Perak Masters.

References

Fijian male golfers
PGA Tour of Australasia golfers
Living people
Year of birth missing (living people)
Place of birth missing (living people)